Pool is a civil parish in the metropolitan borough of the City of Leeds, West Yorkshire, England.  The parish contains twelve listed buildings that are recorded in the National Heritage List for England. All the listed buildings are designated at Grade II, the lowest of the three grades, which is applied to "buildings of national importance and special interest".  The parish contains the Leeds conservation village of Pool-in-Wharfedale and the surrounding countryside.  Most of the listed buildings are houses and cottages, and the others include a church, a former toll house, a bridge, three mileposts, and a war memorial.


Buildings

References

Citations

Sources

 

Pool-in-Wharfedale Archives and www.poolinwharfedalehistory.co.uk

Lists of listed buildings in West Yorkshire